The 1952 Chicago Cardinals season was the 33rd season the team was in the league. The team improved on their previous output of 3–9, winning four games. They failed to qualify for the playoffs for the fourth consecutive season.

Schedule

Standings

References 

Chicago Cardinals
1952
Chicago Card